For other uses, see Sahiwal (disambiguation).

Sahiwal  ((), is a city and capital of Sahiwal Tehsil, in Sargodha District, Punjab, Pakistan.

Populated places in Sargodha District